Mirza Abduljabbar oglu Babayev (16 July 1913 – 14 January 2003) was an Azerbaijani movie actor and singer. He was awarded the title Honored Artist of the Azerbaijan SSR (1956), and People's Artist of Azerbaijan (1992).

Biography
Mirza Babayev was born on 16 July 1913 in Baku, into a family of oil agent. His mother, Sona kanim Khanlarova, was a member of bey family. He got primary education at an art school. In 1939, he graduated from Azerbaijan State Oil Academy. In 1948, Mirza Babayev entered Azerbaijan State Conservatoire, where he studied in the class of Bulbul and in 1953, he graduated from there on vocal speciality.

Title and awards

 Honored Artist of the Azerbaijan SSR (1956)
 People's Artist of Azerbaijan (1992)
 Shohrat Order (2002)
 Humay Award (2 times)

Filmography
 1956 – Not that one, then this one (film)
 1966 – Gipsy girl – Selim bey
 1966 – 26 commissioners of Baku
 1966 – Why are you silent?
 1969 – The indomitable Kura
 1976 – The Darvish Detonates Paris – Dervish Mesteli Shah
 1977 – Magic voice of Jelsomino – Chief of prison
 1981 – Don't worry, I'm with you – Farzali bey
 1985 – Summer season
 1990 – Don't meddle in, it will kill!
 1991 – Hello from the next world

References

1913 births
2003 deaths
Actors from Baku
Soviet male actors
Azerbaijani male film actors
20th-century Azerbaijani male actors
Soviet male singers
20th-century Azerbaijani male singers
People's Artists of Azerbaijan
Soviet Azerbaijani people
Azerbaijan State Oil and Industry University alumni